The Remington Model 34 is a bolt-action rifle that was manufactured by Remington Arms from 1932 until 1935.

Design
The Model 34 is a conventional bolt-action, tube fed rifle.  Though conventional in layout and design, the Model 34 and 341 feature a patented lifter mechanism that presents cartridges to the chamber without the bullet touching rear of the chamber.  This prevents damage to the bullet and conceivably increases accuracy potential.  Remington updated the Model 34 and the Model 341 replaced it in the product line.

Variants
Model 34 NRA
The Model 34 NRA variant had the same specs as the standard model except that it featured a Patridge front and Lyman 55R aperture sight. It was also fitted with a sling for carrying the rifle.

References

External links 
 Official Website

Bolt-action rifles of the United States
Remington Arms firearms
.22 LR rifles